Mogens Truelsen (25 July 1901 – 10 December 1979) was a Danish sprinter. He competed in the men's 100 metres, men's 200 metres and the 4 × 100 metres relay events at the 1924 Summer Olympics.

References

External links
 

1901 births
1979 deaths
Athletes (track and field) at the 1924 Summer Olympics
Danish male sprinters
Olympic athletes of Denmark
Athletes from Copenhagen